is a Japanese professional futsal club, currently playing in the F. League Division 1. The team is located in Hiratsuka, in the west of Kanagawa Prefecture, part of the Greater Tokyo Area. Their main  ground is Odawara Arena.

History

See also
 Shonan Bellmare

References

External links 

  

Futsal clubs in Japan
Shonan Bellmare
Futsal clubs established in 2007
2007 establishments in Japan